Miguel García may refer to:

Miguel García Vivancos (1895–1972), Spanish anarchist and painter
Miguel García García (1908–1981), Spanish anarchist
Miguel García (boxer) (1945–2009), Argentine boxer
Miguel García (baseball) (born 1967), Venezuelan baseball player
Miguel García (canoeist) (born 1973), Spanish sprint canoeist
Miguel García (Spanish footballer) (born 1979), former Spanish football midfielder
Miguel Garcia (Portuguese footballer) (born 1983), Portuguese football defender
Miguel García (water polo) (born 1946), Cuban Olympic water polo player
Miguel García Granados (1809–1878), Guatemalan politician
Miguel García Onsalo (1897–1921), Spanish Olympic runner
Miguel Ángel García (wrestler) (born 1960), Spanish wrestler
Miguel Garcia (politician) (born 1951), American politician in the New Mexico House of Representatives
Miguel García (Mexican footballer) (born 1971), Mexican football defender
Miguel Sebastián Garcia (born 1984), known as Pitu García, Argentine football midfielder

See also

Migue García (born 1991), Spanish footballer
Michael Garcia (disambiguation)
Miguel Ángel García (disambiguation)

Miguel (disambiguation)
Garcia (disambiguation)